Manasichi Choodu is a 1998 Indian Telugu-language romantic drama film directed by Suresh Varma (who previously directed Sivayya)  and starring Vadde Naveen and Raasi. The film was a remake of Tamil film Dhinamdhorum. The film released to positive reviews.

Cast

Production 
Sukumar worked as an assistant director for the film.

Soundtrack 
The music is composed by Mani Sharma. The song "Anthey Ee Prema Varusa" was well received.

Reception 
A critic from Deccan Herald opined that "On the whole a good entertainer". Naveen and Varma later collaborated again for Aadi Lakshmi (2006).

References 

Indian romantic drama films
Telugu remakes of Tamil films
1990s Telugu-language films